The 1925 Giro di Lombardia was the 21st edition of the Giro di Lombardia cycle race and was held on 4 November 1925. The race started and finished in Milan. The race was won by Alfredo Binda.

General classification

References

1925
Giro di Lombardia
Giro di Lombardia